Yvonne Preiswerk (born 3 June 1937 - 14 April 1999) was a Swiss anthropologist. She was a lecturer at the Graduate Institute of International and Development Studies (IUED) in Geneva and professor of ethnology at the Universities of Friborg and Geneva. She was the author of a study on mortuary rites, she is also a scientific editor and director of publications in various fields of anthropology.

Biography
After commercial training, Yvonne Preiswerk moved to Argentina for four years with her husband and two daughters. On her return, she settled in Geneva. In 1972, as a stay-at-home mother, speaking English, German and Spanish, she resumed her training by obtaining a diploma in anthropology at the University Institute for Development Studies (IUED) in Geneva.

In 1981, she published Moi Adeline, midwife, a book which collects the testimony of a midwife from the Val d'Anniviers Adeline Favre. She did her doctoral thesis in history and civilization at the Jean Moulin University Lyon 3. She was a specialist in companies in the Valais and Vaud Alps.

References

Swiss women anthropologists
1937 births
1999 deaths
Academic staff of the Graduate Institute of International and Development Studies
Academic staff of the University of Fribourg
Academic staff of the University of Geneva
Ethnologists